The Old Maid is a 1972 French comedy film directed by Jean-Pierre Blanc. It was entered into the 22nd Berlin International Film Festival where Blanc won the Silver Bear for Best Director.

Plot
Muriel (Annie Girardot) is a shy woman who bluffs and blusters around in order to hide her shyness and to protect her loneliness, even though she longs wistfully for a companion of some sort. She has been lonely so long that now she is an old maid and has never been wooed. But Muriel finally gets a glimpse of romance when Gabriel (Philippe Noiret) walks into the seaside hotel she is vacationing in. His car has broken down, and he has to stay there for a few days while it is repaired. Hers is the only dinner table with room at it, and Gabriel cannot prevent himself from charming women. She is stiff with him at first, but soon they develop a friendship.

Cast
 Annie Girardot – Muriel Bouchon
 Philippe Noiret – Gabriel Marcassus
 Marthe Keller – Vicka
 Édith Scob – Edith, Monod's wife
 Catherine Samie – Clotilde
 Maria Schneider – Mome
 Lorenza Guerrieri – Punaisa
 Albert Simono – Daniel (as Simono)
 Claudine Assera – La servante
 Jean-Pierre Darras – Sacha
 Michael Lonsdale – Monod (as Michel Lonsdale)

Reception
After being projected the film, distributors refused to release it despite the combined star power of its two leads, Annie Girardot and Philippe Noiret. However, it was finally released as a filler after the commercial failure of François Truffaut's Two English Girls. Against all odds, "The Old Maid" became a critical and commercial success, spending ten weeks in France's box office top ten.

As a first time director, Jean Pierre Blanc's performance  was highlighted by the press who praised the elements of social satire of the film, as well as the duo Annie Girardot and Philippe Noiret which was later reunited several times throughout the 1970s in such successful comedies as "La Mandarine" (which was released two weeks after "The Old Maid"), "Dear Detective", or Jupiter's Thigh.

References

External links

1972 films
1972 comedy films
1970s French-language films
French comedy films
Films directed by Jean-Pierre Blanc
Films scored by Michel Legrand
1970s French films